The 2018 Seoul Open Challenger was a professional tennis tournament played on outdoor hard courts. It was the fourth edition of the tournament. It was part of the 2018 ATP Challenger Tour. It took place in Seoul, South Korea, between 30 April and 6 May 2018.

Singles main draw entrants

Seeds 

 1 Rankings as of 23 April 2018.

Other entrants 
The following players received wildcards into the singles main draw:
  Chung Yun-seong
  Hong Seong-chan
  Kim Young-seok
  Park Ui-sung

The following player received entry into the singles main draw as a special exempt:
  Kamil Majchrzak

The following players received entry from the qualifying draw:
  Makoto Ochi
  Son Ji-hoon
  Renta Tokuda
  Yosuke Watanuki

Champions

Singles

 Mackenzie McDonald def.  Jordan Thompson 1–6, 6–4, 6–1.

Doubles

 Toshihide Matsui /  Frederik Nielsen def.  Chen Ti /  Yi Chu-huan 6–4, 7–6(7–3).

References

Seoul Open Challenger
2018
2018 in South Korean tennis